The Camus Cross, otherwise known as the Camuston or Camustane Cross, is an Early Medieval Scottish standing stone on the Panmure Estate near Carnoustie in Angus, Scotland. First recorded in the 15th century in a legal document describing the boundaries between Camuston and the barony of Downie, and described in the 17th century by Robert Maule, it is a freestanding cross, rare in Eastern Scotland.

The cross is thought to date from the 10th century, and exhibits distinctive Hiberno-Scottish mission influences, in common with several other monuments in the area. Tradition and folk etymology suggest that the cross marked the burial site of Camus, leader of the Norse army purportedly defeated by King Malcolm II at the apocryphal Battle of Barry. The name of the stone is likely to derive from the extinct village of Camuston, which has a Celtic toponymy.

Location

The avenue is part of Panmure Estate and leads, beyond the road, to the former site of Panmure House.

Description

All faces and sides are sculpted. The cross has suffered significant weathering, most notably on the west face, which has obscured some of the designs.

The stone bears no idiomatic Pictish symbols and, under J Romilly Allen and Joseph Anderson's classification system, it is a class III stone. Intact freestanding crosses of this age are comparatively rare, perhaps because of their vulnerability to damage, and the only ones in Eastern Scotland are the Camus Cross and the Dupplin Cross in Strathearn. Fragmentary remains of other crosses include heads found at Forteviot, St Vigeans and Strathmartine and shaft fragments found at Monifieth, Abernethy, Carpow and Invermay, as well as some socketed stones where crosses once stood.

The western face is divided into three sections. The uppermost section is almost completely weathered. The antiquarian Alexander Gordon, who described the stone in 1726 in his Itinerarium Septentrionale, records this panel as holding a crucifixion scene, with the figure of a man at the right hand side and the left side completely defaced. Below this is a depiction of a centaur holding a bow, with the lowest panel having a symmetrical floral scroll design. The figures to the left and right are likely to have represented Longinus and Stephaton.

The eastern face is usually interpreted as a depiction of Christ flanked by angels above the four evangelists, although Robert Maule, in the earliest description of the stone, described the scene as Moses giving out the Law.

The carving on the Camus Cross shows distinct similarities with those on the Brechin Hogback stone and point to an Irish Ecclesiastical influence. The foliar designs on the north and south edges, originally seen as Ringerike-like (and hence, Scandinavian in origin), consist of tendrils and volutes with "wave-crest" thickening. These features bear closest similarity with Irish insular art of the late tenth century, and the treatment of the symmetrical foliar scroll design on the lower portion of the west face is diagnostically Irish. The full-face figures on the east face are of an identical type to those on the Brechin Hogback. In the case of the Brechin Hogback, the figures are carrying objects that are characteristic of early medieval Irish monasticism.

History

The Camus Cross is currently thought to be a late Pictish/early Gaelic era monument, dating from the 10th century. The earliest record of it is in a legal document of 1481, describing the boundary of the lands of Camuston, owned by Sir Thomas Maule, and the barony of Downy, owned by the Earl of Crawford. The boundary was described as running "a magna cruce lapidea de Cambiston" ('from the great stone cross of Camuston'). It was mentioned in the context of the Battle of Barry in Hector Boece's Historia Gentis Scotorum in 1527, and first described in detail by the antiquarian Robert Maule, who erected it at its present position in 1620, after moving it six feet to centralise it within the Camuston Wood avenue.

Camus was the supposed leader of a Norse expeditionary force defeated by the armies of King Malcolm II at the Battle of Barry. Tradition, popularised in the sixteenth century by historian Hector Boece, states that Camus fled the battle scene when defeat was imminent, and was caught and slain at the point where the cross now stands. The battle, and its main protagonists, including Camus, are now known to be historically inauthentic.

The name of the cross is likely to derive from the village of Camuston. No trace of this village can be seen today, and it had ceased to exist by the time of the first Ordnance Survey map, published in 1888, but surveyed in 1857 to 1859. Its former location is indicated in the 1794 map by Ainslie, about half a mile to the east of the cross. Camuston can be found with earlier spelling variations, for example, 'Cambistown' as it is called in documents from 1425 and 1426, and has a Celtic rather than Scandinavian etymology.

A burial disinterred in 1598, near the Camus cross, was attributed by Maule as being the body of Camus:

Not far thearfra in the bank of Camstone, the zeir of God Im fywe hundrethe nyntie and aught zeiris, thear wos ane greawe fownd withe ane bread stone on eury quarter thearof efter the forme of ane malt cobile, quharin did ly the heale bons of ane man of gryt statwre, the thee bone quharof ves neir als longue as bothe the schank and thee bone of any reasonable man of this age, the harne pan gryte, and vanted the palme bread of ane hand thearof, quhilk had beine the straik as appeirithe of ane sword, it wes thought to heawe beine Cames the chief mans bwriel.

Little information of the burial exists, but goods found in the cist were kept at Brechin Castle. These were sketched by Jervise and are typical of Bronze Age artifacts, found fairly commonly in the area.

References

Citations

Bibliography

External links
 
 Camus's Cross
 Camus Cross

Pictish stones
Pictish stones in Angus, Scotland
10th century in Scotland
Buildings and structures completed in the 10th century
Monumental crosses in Scotland
10th-century sculptures
Jesus in art
Scheduled Ancient Monuments in Angus
Articles containing Scots-language text